Thomas Ferguson (30 January 1898 – 13 June 1955) was a Scottish footballer who played as a goalkeeper. He spent his entire senior career, spanning 13 years, with Falkirk, and holds the club record for appearances (almost 500 in the Scottish Football League and Scottish Cup). He was selected for the Scottish Football League XI three times and in 1923 he was a member of a squad organised by Third Lanark that toured South America.

References

1898 births
1955 deaths
Scottish footballers
Falkirk F.C. players
Footballers from Falkirk (council area)
Scottish Junior Football Association players
Scottish Football League players
Scottish Football League representative players
Association football goalkeepers
Scottish emigrants to South Africa
Third Lanark A.C. players